Artūrs Kupaks (born 14 July 1973) is a Latvian former professional ice hockey defenceman.

Kupaks started playing in the Soviet League and the International Hockey League for RASMS Riga and Stars Riga, then went on to play eleven additional seasons in the minor leagues of North America for 13 different teams before retiring as a professional player following the 2005–06 season.

Career statistics

References

 
  
  

1973 births
Living people
Austin Ice Bats players
Chesapeake Icebreakers players
Detroit Falcons (CoHL) players
Dinamo Riga players
Greensboro Monarchs players
Houston Aeros (1994–2013) players
Idaho Steelheads (WCHL) players
Las Vegas Thunder players
Latvian expatriate sportspeople in the United States
Latvian ice hockey defencemen
Lubbock Cotton Kings players
New Mexico Scorpions players
Phoenix Mustangs players
Springfield Falcons players
Toledo Storm players
Tulsa Oilers (1992–present) players